James D. Burchett (born November 5, 1980) is an American politician from Georgia. Burchett is a Republican member of Georgia House of Representatives for District 176.

References

Republican Party members of the Georgia House of Representatives
21st-century American politicians
Living people
1980 births